Kuberulu is a 2008 Indian Telugu-language comedy film directed by Srinivas Reddy and starring Sivaji, Farzana, Kausha Rach, Krishna Bhagavaan and Ali.

Cast 
Sivaji as Siva Prasad (imitates Y. S. Rajasekhara Reddy) 
Farzana as Kalpana
Kausha Rach
Krishna Bhagavaan as Rambabu
Ali as Siva Prasad's friend (imitates Chandrababu Naidu)
Siva Prasad as Don
M. S. Narayana as Doctor
Telangana Shakuntala as Bully

Production 
Krishna Bhagavaan, a frequent collaborator with Srinivas Reddy, stars in this film. Y. S. Rajasekhara Reddy launched the film's audio cassette.

Reception
A critic from 123telugu opined that "There are a few films where you walk in without any expectations and walkout without any disappointment. Kuberulu is like that". Jeevi of Idlebrain.com said that "Director Srinivasa Reddy failed to capitalize on an interesting plot. The movie suffers from shabby direction and inept screenplay". A critic from Full Hyderabad wrote that "The performances are actually good, and the first half is pretty funny".

References